18 Greatest Hits is the second greatest hits album by German singer Sandra, released on 12 October 1992 by Virgin Records.

Background, Albums and Achievements -
18 Greatest Hits consists of all Sandra singles released between 1985 and 1992, many of them in shorter 7″ versions, excluding her most recent single, "I Need Love". A new version of "Johnny Wanna Live" from the Paintings in Yellow album was also included and released as a single to promote the collection. A video version of the album was released on VHS, including all 18 music videos.

The compilation peaked at number 10 on the German chart, and has been certified gold in Germany and platinum in France. The album was re-released on 31 March 2003 under the title The Essential with a different artwork, but the same track listing.

Track listing
All tracks are produced by Michael Cretu, except tracks 4, 5 and 7, produced by Cretu and Armand Volker.

Charts

Certifications

References

1992 greatest hits albums
Albums produced by Michael Cretu
Sandra (singer) compilation albums
Virgin Records compilation albums